Alt-Wiedikon is a quarter in the district 3 of Zürich.

It was formerly a part of Wiedikon municipality, which was incorporated into Zürich in 1893.

District 3 of Zürich